Ilaria Pasqui (born 13 December 1979) is an Italian former professional footballer who is in charge Inter Milan women's devolvement program.

International career
Ilaria Pasqui was also part of the Italian team at the 2005 European Championships.

References

External links

1979 births
Living people
People from Emilia-Romagna
Italian women's footballers
Italy women's international footballers
Footballers from Rome
Serie A (women's football) players
S.S. Lazio Women 2015 players
A.S.D. AGSM Verona F.C. players
Women's association football forwards
Torino Women A.S.D. players
Pali Blues players